William Alexander Blount Jr. (May 23, 1879 – October 28, 1918) was an American football coach. He served as the head football coach at the University of Alabama from 1903 to 1904, compiling a career record of 10–7.

Head coaching record

References

External links
 

1879 births
1918 deaths
Alabama Crimson Tide football coaches
University of Alabama alumni
Yale University alumni
Sportspeople from Pensacola, Florida